Bezděkov is a municipality and village in Havlíčkův Brod District in the Vysočina Region of the Czech Republic. It has about 200 inhabitants.

Administrative parts
Hamlets of Hařilova Lhotka and Štěpánov are administrative parts of Bezděkov.

References

Villages in Havlíčkův Brod District